Ansariyeh may refer to:
 Ansari (disambiguation)
 Ansariyeh, Razavi Khorasan